The Police Special Operations Department or Police Special Action, abbreviated as PÖH, is the police tactical unit of the General Directorate of Security in Turkey. The force consists of 22,000 personnel, more than a thousand of whom are women. It is also deployed as part of the Turkish occupation of northern Syria.

History 
The PÖH was founded in 1983 as "Special Operations Office", under the command of Department of Public Security, to prevent armed acts of terrorist organizations residential area or in rural areas, to rescue hostages in places like aircraft, land vehicles, ships, subways, trains, and in enclosed spaces like buildings, to ensure the safety in cities and in civil aviation airports with special skills, modern weapons, ammunition, vehicles, equipment, tactics and techniques.
In larger cities like Ankara, İstanbul, and İzmir, "Special Operations Group Authorities "() were organized in the same year. As a result of changing conditions, in 1987, the office was transferred to the Anti-Terrorism and Operations Department under the name "Special Operations Branch". In 1993, the Special Operations Branch was promoted to a department and gained its current structuring.

İbrahim Şahin was head of the Department until being forced to resign in 1996 over the Susurluk scandal. Ayhan Çarkın was a notable member of the department in the 1990s.

Training 
To qualify for PÖH, an applicant must:
 Run the 2500m designated area with a backpack weighing 10 kg, under 15 minutes
 Have 50% minimum accuracy in pistol and rifle shooting
 Swim 150 m without stopping
 Be between ages 18 and 32
 Have graduated from police high school or university

In addition, a training simulation called TAKSİS is conducted by TÜBİTAK.

After 16 weeks of training, the applicant will get a certificate which officially names him as an operative of PÖH.

Tactics 
PÖH uses automatic and special weapons and rapid deployment tactics for exceptional circumstances such as bank robberies, kidnappings, and hostage rescues, among others. The nature of the unit is quite like US SWAT units or the German GSG 9. PÖH mostly specializes in counter-terrorism (CT) operations against forces and is able to undertake operations in many environments, including buses and planes.

Police Special Operation Department is one of a handful of security forces in the world which employs active front line female squad members in combat operations.

Equipment

Handguns
 Yavuz 16
 Steyr M
 Sig Sauer P226
 Glock 17
 Sarsılmaz Kılınç 2000
 Canik TP9
 Beretta 92
 CZ 75

Shotguns
 Akdal MKA 1919

Submachine guns
 Heckler & Koch MP5
 IMI Uzi

Sniper rifles
 SSG08
 Arctic Warfare Police
 Accuracy International AX50
 Barrett M107
 PSL

Assault rifles
 M16A2
 M4A1
 Heckler & Koch HK416
 Heckler & Koch HK417
 SIG Sauer SIG516
 Steyr AUG
 LMT 308
 MKEK MPT-76

Machine guns
 FN Minimi
 M60 machine gun

Vehicles
 Otokar Akrep
 Otokar Cobra
 Nurol Ejder
 BMC - Kirpi

Attack Helicopters
T129 ATAK

Sources 

National law enforcement agencies of Turkey
Non-military counterterrorist organizations
Police tactical units
Special forces of Turkey